Jason F. Brennan (born 1979) is an American philosopher and business professor. He is currently the Robert J. and Elizabeth Flanagan Family Professor of Strategy, Economics, Ethics, and Public Policy at the McDonough School of Business at Georgetown University.

Brennan writes about democratic theory, the ethics of voting, competence and power, freedom, and the moral foundations of commercial society. His work focuses on the intersection of normative political philosophy and the empirical social sciences, especially on questions about voter behavior, pathologies of democracy, and the consequences of freedom. He argues that most citizens have a moral obligation not to vote.

Early life
Brennan grew up in Tewksbury, Massachusetts, and Hudson, New Hampshire. He attended Case Western Reserve University and the University of New Hampshire as an undergraduate. He earned his Ph.D. in philosophy at the University of Arizona under the direction of David Schmidtz. From 2006 to 2011, he was a research fellow at the Political Theory Project, and later assistant professor of philosophy at Brown University.

Books
 , with David Schmidtz
 
 
 , with Lisa Hill
 
 , with Peter Jaworski
 
 
 , with Bas van der Vossen
 
 , with Phil Magness
 , with Chris W. Surprenant
 
 
 , with William English, John Hasnas and Peter Jaworski
 , with Hélène Landemore

See also
 American philosophy

References

External links
 Jason Brennan's faculty page
 Bleeding Heart Libertarians – blog
 200-Proof Liberals – blog
 Jason Brennan at Learn Liberty
 "On the ethics of voting" (interview with Jason Brennan), 3:AM Magazine, January 14, 2013
 

1979 births
Living people
21st-century American philosophers
American ethicists
American libertarians
American political philosophers
Analytic philosophers
Brown University faculty
McDonough School of Business faculty
Libertarian theorists
People from Hudson, New Hampshire
People from Tewksbury, Massachusetts
Philosophers from Massachusetts
Philosophers from New Hampshire
Philosophers from Washington, D.C.
University of Arizona alumni
Voting theorists